Martian language is the nickname of unconventional representation of Chinese characters online.

Martian language may also refer to:

A hypothetical alien language that dwellers of Mars would use
Barsoomian language, the Martian language of Edgar Rice Burroughs
Fake "Martian language" fabricated by Hélène Smith